The 1943 New Mexico Lobos football team represented the University of New Mexico as an independent during the 1943 college football season.  In their second season under head coach Willis Barnes, the Lobos compiled a 3–2 record and were outscored by opponents by a total of 85 to 59.

Schedule

References

New Mexico
New Mexico Lobos football seasons
New Mexico Lobos football